Aijia Lise Grammer (born June 26, 1986) is an American, singer, songwriter, actress, and television star from Los Angeles, California. Her self-released extended play under the title Learning to Let Go was released in 2012. She has worked as a touring singer for Selena Gomez, Colbie Caillat, Hilary Duff, Jack Black and her husband Andy Grammer.

Early life 
Born June 26, 1986 as Aijia Lise Guttman in Los Angeles, California, Aijia took part in choir shows and talent shows from school age.

She is maternal granddaughter to Helen Guttman, former owner of Anti Club; formerly located in Melrose Hill in Los Angeles. Anti Club hosted bands such as Red Hot Chili Peppers, System of a Down, Weezer, Faith No More, Sonic Youth, and The Cult.

Her paternal Grandfather was head of the Jazz Piano Dept at the University of Southern California.

She is the Paternal Niece of voiceover actress and fellow alumni of The Voice E.G. Daily .

Education 
An alumnus of California State University, Northridge, she majored in Jazz Studies. While studying she started an internship at Warner Records supplementing her learning with that of publicity, marketing and A&R.

Personal life 
She is wife to recording artist Andy Grammer, whom she married in July 2012 in Fullerton, California.

She and husband Andy are parents to daughters Louisiana K Grammer (born July 28, 2017) and Israel Blue Grammer (born April 3, 2020). During pregnancy Grammer suffered from complications due to Hyperemesis gravidarum.

During their time at California State University, Northridge she met husband Andy while both were enrolled as music students.

Aijia and husband Andy have spoken in the past about their adherence to the Baháʼí Faith.

Musical career 
Grammer began teaching piano lessons to kids, playing local gigs to her native Los Angeles, and writing music for commercials, trailers and TV. She went on to singing backing vocals for other artists including Selena Gomez, Colbie Caillat, Hilary Duff, Jack Black, Rachel Platten and her husband Andy Grammer. In 2011, Aijia played for the U.S. troops on a USO tour throughout Iraq, Kuwait, Kosovo and Germany. Under the performing name of Aijia, Grammer self-released her debut EP titled Learning to Let Go in 2012. This was followed in 2018 and 2019 respectively by singles "For You" and "Magic".

Grammer is also an ambassador for the Los Angeles chapter of Rock and Roll Camp for Girls, a non-profit organisation which describes itself as "a social Justice organization empowering girls through music education." Other notable ambassadors include Sara Bareilles, Katy Perry, Andra Day, Patty Schemel, Shirley Manson and Keala Settle.

Grammer lists her influences including Alicia Keys, Sia, and Amy Winehouse. Her preferred equipment on stage is the Korg SV-1 88-Key Stage Vintage Piano.

Entertainment industry career 
She starred in a production of Andrew Lloyd Webber's, Jesus Christ Superstar in Los Angeles in 2006. In 2010 she starred as the part of Angela in The Alliance Theater's production of Twist: An American Musical, staged by Debbie Allen.
In the 2010s Grammer played roles in short films, including Drew's 5th Birthday, Girls Night, and The First Step directed by Donnie Hobbie and Ally Zonsius, and Michael A. MacRae respectively.

In 2016 she appeared on Season 10 of American singing competition television series The Voice.

Her first feature-length appearance was as Kristin in Snare directed by Khu and Justin Price, also in 2016.
In 2019 Grammer joined the casting department of American songwriting competition series Songland as a talent producer during their first season.

Discography

As Aijia

Extended Plays and Singles 
 Learning to Let Go 2012

Singles 
 "Magic" 2019
 "For You" 2018

Songwriting Credits

Singles 
 "Over Getting Over You" 2020 - performed by Molly Moore
 "Black Halo" - written with Josh Doyle and Josh Nyback
 "Did It To Myself" - written with Josh Doyle and Evan Hillhouse
 "Coming For You" - written with Josh Tangney and Andre De Santanna
 "Just Gettin Started" - written with Josh Doyle and Josh Nyback
 "Love Is What Happens" - written with Dayyon Alexander and Ryan Beatty
 "Time of Our Lives" - written with Josh Doyle and Josh Nyback
 "Trouble" - written with Josh Doyle and Josh Nyback
 "When I'm With You" - written with Josh Tangney and Andre De Santanna
 "Whenever Whatever" - written with Josh Doyle and Josh Nyback
 "Woman Scorned" - written with Josh Doyle and Josh Nyback

Filmography

Film

Television

Music Videos

External links

References

1986 births
Living people
American women singer-songwriters
Musicians from Los Angeles
American women pop singers
Singer-songwriters from California
21st-century American women singers
21st-century American singers